Party Girl is a 2014 French drama film written and directed by Marie Amachoukeli, Claire Burger and Samuel Theis. It won the Un Certain Regard Ensemble Prize and the Camera d'Or award at the 2014 Cannes Film Festival. The story is inspired by the life of Angélique Litzenburger, who played herself in the film, it also stars the co-director Samuel Theis and his siblings Mario, Séverine and Cynthia. The title of the film is derived from the song of the same name by Michelle Gurevich.

Cast

 Angélique Litzenburger as Angélique Litzenburger 
 Joseph Bour as Michel Henrich 
 Mario Theis as Mario Theis 
 Samuel Theis as Samuel Theis 
 Séverine Litzenburger as Séverine Litzenburger 
 Cynthia Litzenburger as Cynthia Litzenburger 
 Chantal Dechuet as Madame Dechuet 
 Alyssia Litzenburger as Alyssia Litzenburger 
 Nathanaël Litzenburger as Nathanaël Litzenburger
 Meresia Litzenburger as Meresia Litzenburger 
 Sébastien Roussel as Sébastien 
 Vincenza Vespa as Enza 
 Jenny Bussi as Jenny 
 Zaina Benhabouche as Zaina  
 Marguerite Duval as Marguerite

Accolades

References

External links
 

2014 films
2014 drama films
2014 directorial debut films
2010s French-language films
French drama films
Caméra d'Or winners
2010s French films